Chip Tooth Smile is the fourth studio album by American singer Rob Thomas, released on April 26, 2019, through Atlantic Records. It is his first album in four years, following 2015's The Great Unknown, and was preceded by the single "One Less Day (Dying Young)", which reached the top 20 at adult contemporary radio in the United States. Thomas embarked on tour in North America in support of the album in May 2019.

Background
The album title comes from a chipped tooth Thomas got when he was a teenager slamdancing. After his success with Matchbox Twenty Thomas could finally afford dental work although his wife stated that he wasn't allowed to get his chip tooth fixed believing his "chip tooth smile" gave him personality.

The album is produced by Butch Walker, Thomas began telling people that Walker was producing the album before he had talked to Walker about it eventually telling him that "he had to do the record because I already told everyone that he's doing it". Thomas has described the record as "mostly me and Butch" as there were only two other musicians that played on the album. 

The music was shaped by Thomas' 1980s influences as well as "the pop-rock songs for which he's become so well-known." Thomas stated that while making the album, he was doing so primarily for his fans and not to necessarily draw in those who had not previously heard his music.

Promotion
Thomas called lead single "One Less Day (Dying Young)" an "anthem about life and living". It was considered similar in sound to Bruce Springsteen, as was the album cover. A music video was also released for the track, directed by Andy Morahan, that shows Thomas performing the song surrounded by candles and accompanied by a fire dancer.

Track listing

Charts

References

2019 albums
Rob Thomas (musician) albums